Pimelea hispida, commonly known as bristly pimelea, is a species of flowering plant in the family Thymelaeaceae and is endemic to the southwest of Western Australia. It is an erect shrub with elliptic leaves and erect clusters of pink flowers surrounded by 4 green involucral bracts.

Description
Flowering occurs from September to December.

Taxonomy
Pimelea hispida was first formally described in 1810 by Robert  Brown in his book Prodromus Florae Novae Hollandiae et Insulae Van Diemen. The specific epithet (hispida) means "with bristly hairs", referring to the flowers.

Distribution and habitat
Bristly pimelea grows on winter-wet flats and on coastal sand hills and is found from Geographe Bay to Albany and in the Stirling Range, in the Esperance Plains, Jarrah Forest, Swan Coastal Plain and Warren bioregions of south-western Western Australia.

Conservation status
This pimelea is list as "not threatened" by the Western Australian Government Department of Biodiversity, Conservation and Attractions.

References

hispida
Malvales of Australia
Flora of Western Australia
Plants described in 1810
Taxa named by Robert Brown (botanist, born 1773)